The Burning Red is the third studio album by American heavy metal band Machine Head. It is the band's second best selling album in the US, selling as many copies in three years as their debut album, Burn My Eyes, sold in almost eight years . The album has sold over 134,000 copies in the US and it was certified silver in 2011 by the BPI for sales of 60,000 in the UK. The Burning Red was Machine Head's first album with guitarist Ahrue Luster, as well as their first venture into nu metal.

Music and lyrics

The album is mainly considered nu metal. This departure from the band's groove metal style led to backlash from fans. Fans also complained about rapping heard in songs like "From This Day" or "Desire to Fire". Machine Head's drummer Dave McClain said, "Pissing people off isn't a bad thing, you know? For people to be narrow-minded is bad ... [i]t doesn't bother us at all, we know we're going to piss people off with this record, but some people hopefully will actually sit down and listen to the whole record". Robb Flynn, Machine Head's vocalist, said 

Machine Head guitarist Logan Mader quit the band in 1998 following the recording of their album The More Things Change... (according to the official Machine Head Facebook Page, he wrote the main riff for "I Defy" before his departure); he was replaced by Ahrue Luster. With the recording of The Burning Red, the band added new elements to its music, including a small amount of rapping vocals, a move which some believe to have been influenced by Luster himself. The album shows the band experimenting musically, using a disco drum line in "The Blood, the Sweat, the Tears", putting some rapping vocals in "Desire to Fire", and a layer of crooning vocals on "Silver". Citing the need for a few B-side tracks, producer Ross Robinson encouraged the band to record a smooth-sounding cover of the Police song "Message in a Bottle" after hearing Robb Flynn experiment with it during rehearsal. However, Flynn strongly fought against it being included on the album, and still does not think highly of the cover. The song ended up on the album, not used as a B-side. Joel McIver, however, refused to label The Burning Red nu metal, and he wrote that anyone dismissing the album as nu metal has not listened to it, or is not a fan of the "atmospheric, impassioned groove-metal that Machine Head were focusing on at this stage."

Rick Anderson of AllMusic called the album "aggro-metal". Responding to critics, McClain stated the band was not trying to emulate popular trends; they simply "wanted to sound different". Flynn said that the band had been pigeonholed by those who complained that the two prior albums were too similar to each other, so the band had determined to reach for different influences on this project.

Amy Sciaretto of CMJ said that, despite the presence of Robinson who had produced Limp Bizkit and Korn, The Burning Red shows the progression of Machine Head's own "visceral, gut-grinding" sound rather than an imitation of Korn.

The song "Five" is about a sexual abuse incident Flynn suffered as a five-year-old child. Flynn said that recording the song was difficult enough for him; he would never perform it on stage.

Reception 
The Burning Red was added to US radio playlists on July 12, 1999, and was released for retail sale on August 9. The album was well received by critics and sold well, but the band's change in image and musical direction was highly criticized, with critics and fans alike accusing the band of "selling out". However, Rick Anderson of AllMusic was among those who praised the album, stating Machine Head was "sounding a bit looser and less constricted musically than they have in the past." David Jarman wrote for CMJ that the album was "pretty much aggro business-as-usual" for fans who were already familiar with the "aggression and alienation" of late-1990s metal musical trends, but that listeners could expect to revel in the album's "thunderous visceral crunch." The Burning Red became Machine Head's top selling album for a number of years, and debuted at number 88 on the Billboard 200.

Shortly after the release of the album, Ross Robinson alleged there was significant tension between him and frontman Robb Flynn during the recording sessions, which he described in an interview as an "very headstrong". In that same interview, he denied having had any influence on the album's writing process. In response, a full page disparaging Robinson appeared on the band's website, calling him "ass of the month" and accusing him of trying to cover himself because of the album's mixed reception. This page also quoted another interview where Robinson described his production approach to the band and how it was an influence on them.

In 2019, Loudwire included Machine Head's "Message in a Bottle" cover on their list of the "Top 55 Best Metal Covers of Classic Rock." They considered it to be part of a greater trend of nu metal pop covers, but still said, "Robb Flynn and friends made a surprising choice in The Police's “Message in a Bottle,” which they proceed to deconstruct into a mewling, self-loathing hate-fest — the good kind."

Track listing 

 *Writing credits according to Hellalive liner notes

Personnel 
 Robb Flynn – lead vocals, rhythm guitar
 Ahrue Luster – lead guitar, intro arrangements on "Enter the Phoenix"
 Adam Duce – bass, backing vocals
 Dave McClain – drums

Chart positions

Certifications

References 

1999 albums
Nu metal albums by American artists
Albums produced by Ross Robinson
Machine Head (band) albums
Roadrunner Records albums